David Longstreth (born December 17, 1981) is an American singer and songwriter. He is the lead singer and guitarist for the band Dirty Projectors.

Biography
Longstreth was born in Southbury, Connecticut. Longstreth attended Yale University and majored in music shortly before dropping out halfway through his second year. He stated that "he rarely ventured out of his dorm room. He found himself completely absorbed in making his own music, though there wasn’t really anyone to play it for." After dropping out, he moved in with his brother in Portland, Oregon and worked on his first album The Graceful Fallen Mango, which he released in 2002. Shortly after completing the album, Longstreth returned to Yale to finish his degree and began making music under the Dirty Projectors title. He proceeded to record multiple records under the name during his time at Yale.

In 2015, he contributed to "FourFiveSeconds", a collaborative song by Rihanna, Kanye West and Paul McCartney. That same year, he composed a classical composition called "Michael Jordan". It was composed for New York group Ensemble LPR. He also contributed to the orchestral arrangement for the song "Time, As a Symptom" on the album Divers by American musician Joanna Newsom. In 2016, he produced the album Azel by Nigerian musician Bombino and collaborated on the Solange release, A Seat at the Table.

Longstreth is the younger brother of American painter, musician, and internet radio personality Jake Longstreth.

References

American rock singers
American rock guitarists
American male guitarists
1981 births
Living people
People from Southbury, Connecticut
Yale School of Music alumni
Dirty Projectors members
Domino Recording Company artists
21st-century American male singers
21st-century American singers
21st-century American guitarists